Ramón Sala Vallhonrat (born 8 August 1971 in Terrassa, Catalonia) is a former field hockey defender from Spain, who won the silver medal with the men's national team at the 1996 Summer Olympics in Atlanta, Georgia.

References
Spanish Olympic Committee

External links
 

1971 births
Living people
Spanish male field hockey players
Field hockey players from Catalonia
Male field hockey defenders
Sportspeople from Terrassa
Olympic field hockey players of Spain
Field hockey players at the 1996 Summer Olympics
1998 Men's Hockey World Cup players
Field hockey players at the 2000 Summer Olympics
2002 Men's Hockey World Cup players
Olympic silver medalists for Spain
Olympic medalists in field hockey
Medalists at the 1996 Summer Olympics
Club Egara players